Loew's State Theater (or Theatre) can refer to any of various movie palaces at one time owned by Loew's, including:
State Theatre (Los Angeles), California
Holyoke Opera House, Massachusetts, as it was known from 1945 to 1955
Landmark Theatre (Syracuse, New York)
Loew's State Theatre (New York City), 1540 Broadway, now the site of the Bertelsmann Building
Providence Performing Arts Center, formerly known as the Loew's State Theater, Providence, Rhode Island

See also
Loew's Grand Theatre, Atlanta, Georgia
Loew's Wonder Theatres

Loew's Theatres buildings and structures